is a Japanese anime series created as part of the multimedia project between Yasushi Akimoto, Aniplex, and Sony Music Records. The series features the idol girl group of the same name as their characters.

A short series on the official YouTube channel of the group, titled The Diary of Our Days, was animated by CloverWorks and aired on March 28, 2018. A TV series is animated by A-1 Pictures and premiered from January 11 to March 28, 2020. A preview for episodes 1 and 2 was scheduled for a special screening on January 4, 2020, also featuring the cast.

In December 2019, a mobile musical rhythm game developed by h.a.n.d. with ForwardWorks and published by Aniplex was announced.

Synopsis
The story focuses on eight girls who are each sent a mysterious invitation from a talent agency called G.I. Productions. Upon assembling together, the girls are immediately told to form an idol group known as 22/7, following orders printed out by a mysterious entity known only as "The Wall".

Characters

Other characters

A manager at G.I. Productions.

A mysterious wall that prints out directives that 22/7 must follow. Since The Wall's identity is unknown, the 22/7 members use a stuffed cat plushie to represent it.

Miu's mother.

Miu's Little Sister.

Media

Anime
An eight-episode original net animation called The Diary of Our Days was aired on March 28, 2018. The ONA was animated by CloverWorks and directed by Shin Wakabayashi.

An anime television series was announced in 2017. The series is animated by A-1 Pictures and directed by Takao Abo, with Chiaki Nagai and Reiji Miyajima handling series composition, and Majiro designing the characters. The series aired between January 11 and March 28, 2020 on Tokyo MX, GTV, GYT and BS11. AbemaTV streams the series in Japan, while Aniplex of America streams the series on FunimationNow; it also became available on Crunchyroll on February 10. The episodes feature unique ending themes, which are included in the Blu-ray Disc releases of the anime. The series ran for 12 episodes, with a 13th "extra episode" released on September 16, 2020.

Manga
A manga adaptation, titled 22/7 +α, written by Reiji Miyajima and illustrated by Nao Kasai, was serialized on Shogakukan's Sunday Webry website and app from January 12 to March 29, 2020, telling an original story not told in the anime. Shogakukan collected its chapters in two tankōbon volumes, released on February 12 and April 10, 2020.

Game

On December 24, 2019, a rhythm mobile game titled 22/7 Ongaku no Jikan was announced and in development by Aniplex, H.A.N.D., and Forward Works. The game was released on May 27, 2020 for iOS and Android. On September 30, 2021, the game announced they were ending services on December 22, 2021.

Notes

References

External links
 

2018 anime ONAs
A-1 Pictures
Animated musical groups
Anime with original screenplays
Aniplex
CloverWorks
Japanese idols in anime and manga
Shogakukan manga
Shōnen manga
Tokyo MX original programming